Beau fixe (also known as Set Fare) is a 1992 French film directed by Christian Vincent, who co-wrote screenplay with Philippe Alard. The film tells the story of four female pre-med students, who revise for their final exams at a rented coastal resort during two weeks in the summer vacation. It was nominated for the César Award for Most Promising Actress (Isabelle Carré and Elsa Zylberstein).

Cast
 Isabelle Carré as Valerie 
 Elsa Zylberstein as Frederique  
 Judith Remy as Carine  
 Estelle Larrivaz as Armelle  
 Frédéric Gélard as Francis

References

External links
 
 
 
 Beau fixe at filmsdefrance.com

1992 films
French drama films
Films directed by Christian Vincent
Pan-Européenne films
1990s French films